Slover-Bradham House is a historic house located at New Bern, Craven County, North Carolina.  It was built about 1848, and is a three-story, Renaissance style brick dwelling with a low hipped roof.  During the American Civil War, under the direction of General Ambrose Burnside it served as headquarters of the Eighteenth Army Corps and the Department of North Carolina.  Pepsi Cola inventor Caleb Bradham owned the house from 1908 until 1934.

It was listed on the National Register of Historic Places in 1973.

References

External links

Historic American Buildings Survey in North Carolina
Houses on the National Register of Historic Places in North Carolina
Renaissance Revival architecture in North Carolina
Houses completed in 1848
Houses in New Bern, North Carolina
National Register of Historic Places in Craven County, North Carolina